Ron Kenoly (born December 6, 1944) is an American Christian worship leader, singer, and songwriter whose expressed mission is "to create an environment for the manifest presence of God".  His musical style is one of jubilant praise and individual excellence on musical instruments.  Although Kenoly himself only plays on one of his recordings, he leads comfortably with his voice and is always backed up by musicians and a large choir.

He holds several degrees, including a music degree from Alameda College, a Master of Divinity from Faith Bible College, and a Doctorate of Ministry in Sacred music from Friends International Christian University. His music career began following time spent in the United States Air Force. He was originally with a group called The Mellow Fellows, but family issues caused him to leave the group. His critical success came in 1992 when Lift Him Up became the fastest selling worship album to that point. Welcome Home produced by Tom Brooks was also critically acclaimed, becoming Billboard'''s Top contemporary worship music album, and winning a Gospel Music Association Dove Award for "Praise and Worship Album" in 1997. He was signed to Integrity Music, but is no longer recording for them.

He began working in full-time ministry in 1985. He started out as a worship leader at Jubilee Christian Center in San Jose, California. Not long after that, in 1987, he was ordained and installed as Music Pastor. As worship leader, his sole focus was leading worship service. When he became music pastor, he became the shepherd over the entire music department at Jubilee Christian Center. In 1993, after the two Integrity recordings, he started receiving invitations from all over the world.  Churches not only wanted him to come lead praise and worship, but also to help them develop their music departments.  So shortly afterwards, he was named Ambassador of Music at Jubilee Christian Center.  He was sent out from the church as an ambassador to the world to help churches develop and find the balance between worship and the Word.  In 1996, he received his Doctorate in Ministry of Sacred Music.  In 1999, he felt the call to move from California to the East Coast.  So, he relocated the ministry to Central Florida where he continues to travel, speak, sing, teach and record. He sings all over the world. Kenoly has also written a few books, one of them written with his pastor, Dick Bernal.

 Biography 
Kenoly states that when his mother, Edith Kenoly, was pregnant with him, she would rub her stomach, and her prayer was, "Lord let this one praise you."

After graduating from high school in his birthplace, Coffeyville, Kansas, Kenoly ventured out to Hollywood, California. When plans to make it in the big city fell through, he joined the Air Force in 1965.  It was in the military that he met and married Tavita, his wife of 42 years. It was also there that the humble beginnings of his music career were launched. Kenoly joined the Mellow Fellows, a top 40 cover band that toured military bases. In 1968, he left the Air Force and the Mellows Fellows behind and shipped out to the City of Angels to go after his passion: music.

"As a child I remember seeing Sammy Davis Jr. and Nat King Cole for the first time. I was so impressed as I watched two Black men grace a national stage. I knew right then that was what I wanted." So for the next few years, Kenoly poured all of his energy into making his childhood dream a reality. He sang demos of Jimmy Webb songs, like the 70's hit "Up, Up and Away," for the Audio Arts label. The label also released Kenoly's first single, "The Glory of Your Love (Mine Eyes Have Seen)." Success in the R&B arena came after he signed with A&M Records. Under that label, he cranked out songs like, "Soul Vaccination".

Ron Kenoly and Candy were the first act signed to Semper's Inner City label. Their "Lovely Weekend" single was a massive success selling close to 200,000 copies. "The two of them came and sang the song at my house and I knew straight away I wanted to sign them," explains Semper. "We recorded it at CBA (Clark Brown Audio) recording studio in the Crenshaw district of Los Angeles in 1972.

A&M Records boosted his success with R&B. The label executives changed his name to Ron Keith. He made R&B hits such as 'I Betcha I'll Get Ya', 'Soul Vaccination', and (in 1975) 'Can't Live Without You'.

Some years later, he decided to drop R&B music and devote himself to a Christian life. He tried for four years to get a gospel record deal. In 1983, he released a custom-made album, You Ought to Listen to This. It was a project known around Kenoly's community (not internationally released).

Kenoly eventually started leading praise and worship for other pastors such as Jack Hayford and Lester Sumrall. This caught the attention of evangelist Mario Murillo, who introduced him to Pastor Dick Bernal, the founder of Jubilee Christian Center. Ron Kenoly became the church's music minister in 1987.

 Discography 

 1983: You Ought to Listen to This 1991: Jesus Is Alive 1992: Lift Him Up with Ron Kenoly 1994: God Is Able 1995: Sing Out with One Voice 1996: Welcome Home 1997: High Places: The Best of Ron Kenoly 1998: Majesty 1999: We Offer Praises 2001: Dwell in the House 2002: The Perfect Gift  2005: Fill the Earth 2005: Lift Him Up Collection 2008: Powerful Hymns My Mother Sang 2009: Solo Para Ti 2010: Christmas with Ron Kenoly 2013: Set Apart Is Your Name Yahuwah Vol.1 2014: Set Apart Is Your Name Yahuwah Vol.2 featuring David Hunter
 2019: Kabiosi (live in London)

 Songs 

Songs written or co-written by Kenoly
 Jesus Is Alive (1991)
 "Jesus Is Alive"
 "Keeper of My Heart" with Kelly Husted
 Lift Him Up with Ron Kenoly (1992)
 "Hallowed Be Your Name" with Louis Smith
 "We're Going Up to the High Places"
 God Is Able (1994)
 "Our God Is Able (Rap)"
 "Use Me" with Dewitt Jones
 "Jesus Is Alive"
 Sing Out with One Voice (1995)
 "Joyfully, Joyfully"
 "Give to the Lord"
 "Welcome Rap"
 "We Dedicate This Time"
 Welcome Home (1996)
 "Go Ahead"
 "Heal Their Land"
 "I Testify Today" with Louis Smith
 "Welcome Home"
 "I Love To Love You Lord" with Louis Smith
 "Lord I Magnify" with Tavita Kenoly (wife)
 Majesty (1998)
 "Hallelujah to the King of Kings" with Renetha Muldrew
 "The King of Kings Is Coming" with Bob Ayala
 "Return To Righteousness America" with Don Moen and Tom Brooks
 "In Righteousness You Reign"
 "Hallelujah Reprise/Hallelujah Chorus (Hallelujah to the King of Kings)" with Handel, George Frederick and Renetha Muldrew
 We Offer Praises (1999)
 "We Offer Praises"
 "It Is Good"
 "Joshua Generation"
 "Plane Crash Testimony" (spoken word)
 "Broken Leg Testimony" (spoken word)
 "I Still Have Joy"
 Dwell in the House (2001)
 "Praise Him"
 "All The Way"

Filmography
 2010 - The Bill Collector''

Personal life
Kenoly has five brothers (Mark Kenoly and Craig Kenoly) and three sons with his wife Tavita - Samuel, Ronald (referred as The Kenoly Brothers) and his oldest son Tony. His cousin is American actor, Don Cheadle. Kenoly remarried on November 24, 2014, to Diana Kenoly who is now a UN Ambassador.

References

External links
 Ron Kenoly Official Website
 
 Ron Kenoly Artist Profile at New Release Tuesday
 Ron Kenoly: The Ex-R&B singer now enjoying US CCM success

1944 births
Living people
20th-century Christians
21st-century Christians
African-American Christians
American performers of Christian music
People from Coffeyville, Kansas
Singers from Kansas
Songwriters from Kansas
United States Air Force airmen
African-American male songwriters
20th-century African-American male singers
21st-century African-American male singers